Charles Rhodes Pomeroy (June 15, 1830 – June 25, 1916) was an American educator most notable for serving as the Kansas State Normal School's (KSN) third president in Emporia, Kansas.

Biography

Early life and education
Pomeroy was born in Weybridge, Addison County, Vermont on June 15, 1830. In 1856 Pomeroy graduated from Wesleyan University with a bachelor's and master's of arts, and 1875, he graduated from Simpson Centenary College in Indianola, Iowa with a doctorate.

Early career
In 1854, Pomeroy started his long career in education by teaching Greek at Fort Edward Institute in Fort Edward, New York. From 1855 to 1860, Pomeroy served as a principal at four different institutions: Union Village Academy for one year, Rochester High School for two years, and Genesee Wesleyan Seminary for one year.

Kansas State Normal School presidency
The Kansas Board of Regents selected Pomeroy as the Kansas State Normal School's third president in October 1873. He would begin his tenure on January 1, 1874. Because the economy was poor, Pomeroy was unable to pay the professors and staff and also had to work without salary; the board voted that bonds would be paid to teachers as a way of thanking them for their service during the school year on July 2, 1879.

During Pomeroy's tenure, a tornado had hit in April 1878 and destroyed the main building on campus, which was followed by a fire that destroyed the two buildings at the school. On August 6, 1879, Pomeroy resigned as president.

Later career
After serving four years as president of the Normal School in Emporia, Pomeroy became Callahan College's president for six years. From 1886 to 1899, Pomeroy served as the Dean and a professor at the University of Puget Sound in Washington (state).

Personal life
On December 2, 1854, Pomeroy married Mary J. Meeker and had one child, Charles Harrington Pomeroy on March 28, 1863.

References

Presidents of Emporia State University
Emporia State University faculty
Wesleyan University alumni
Simpson College alumni
University of Puget Sound faculty
People from Weybridge, Vermont
1830 births
1916 deaths
People from Vashon, Washington